Tercio de Gallegos was a unit of Spanish Creole militias of Buenos Aires, created during the British invasions of the River Plate. It was composed mainly of militiamen from Galicia, its commander was Pedro Cerviño, born in Campo Lameiro, Pontevedra.

The Third of Gallegos was dissolved in 1809, after the support of its members to Martín de Álzaga against the viceroy Santiago de Liniers. Towards 1807, this military unit had eight rifle companies, and one of Grenadiers in command of Jacobo Adrián Varela, who had an outstanding performance during the Combate del Retiro, occurred on July 5 of that year.

References

External links 
El_Tercio_de_Gallegos.pdf

Regiments of Argentina
Military history of Argentina
Río de la Plata
Military units and formations of the Napoleonic Wars